Iuliu Nosa (born September 25, 1956) is a politician from Romania. He served as the Mayor of Zalău and as a member of the Chamber of Deputies of Romania.

References

External links 
  Iuliu NOSA Parliamentary activity in legislature 2004-2008

1956 births
Social Democratic Party (Romania) politicians
Living people
People from Sălaj County 
Mayors of places in Romania
People from Zalău
Members of the Chamber of Deputies (Romania)
Technical University of Cluj-Napoca alumni